The Big Raven Plateau is a lava plateau in northern British Columbia, Canada, located west of Mount Edziza in Mount Edziza Provincial Park and Recreation Area.  It is part of the Tahltan Highland, which is the southwestern sub-region of the Stikine Plateau.

See also
Mount Edziza volcanic complex
Volcanism of Canada
Volcanism of Western Canada
Volcanic history of the Northern Cordilleran Volcanic Province

References

Lava plateaus
Mount Edziza volcanic complex
Tahltan Highland